Trayce Nikolas Thompson (born March 15, 1991) is an American professional baseball outfielder for the Los Angeles Dodgers of Major League Baseball (MLB). He has also played for the Chicago White Sox, Oakland Athletics, Chicago Cubs, and the San Diego Padres. Thompson also played for the Great Britain National Team in the 2023 World Baseball Classic.

Trayce is the son of former National Basketball Association (NBA) player Mychal Thompson and the younger brother of current NBA player Klay Thompson.

Early career
Thompson attended Santa Margarita Catholic High School in Rancho Santa Margarita, California. He committed to attend the University of California, Los Angeles (UCLA) to play college baseball for the UCLA Bruins.

Professional career

Chicago White Sox
The Chicago White Sox selected Thompson in the second round of the 2009 MLB Draft, and he signed rather than enroll at UCLA. Thompson started his baseball career in 2009 at the Rookie level with the Bristol White Sox and Great Falls Voyagers. In 2009 combined, Thompson hit .198 in 106 at-bats. In 2010, Thompson played the whole season for the Kannapolis Intimidators of the Class A South Atlantic League. In 2010, Thompson hit .229 in 210 at-bats. In 2011, Thompson again played the whole season with Kannapolis hitting .241 in 519 at-bats, and was named to the mid-season SAL All-star team. In 2012, Thompson moved up through the White Sox farm system starting with the Winston-Salem Dash of the Class A-Advanced Carolina League, then moved up to the Birmingham Barons of the Class AA Southern League and the Charlotte Knights of the Class AAA International League. In 2012, Thompson hit a combined .253 in 517 at-bats. Before the 2013 season, Thompson was ranked the White Sox #2 prospect. Thompson spent the entire 2013 season at Double-A Birmingham where he hit .229 in 507 at bats.

Thompson was added to the White Sox' 40-man roster on November 20, 2013. The White Sox promoted Thompson to the major leagues on August 3, 2015, and he made his debut the next day. He hit his first major league home run on August 11 against Hector Santiago.

Los Angeles Dodgers
On December 16, 2015, Thompson, along with Micah Johnson and Frankie Montas, were traded to the Los Angeles Dodgers as part of a three team trade that sent Todd Frazier to the White Sox and José Peraza, Brandon Dixon and Scott Schebler to the Cincinnati Reds. He made the Dodgers' 2016 opening day roster. He played in 80 games for the Dodgers, hitting .225 with 13 homers and 32 RBI. He was placed on the disabled list on July 16 with a sore back. When his injury did not respond to treatment, he underwent an X-Ray which revealed that he had multiple fractures in his back, which kept him out of action for the rest of the season.

After recovering from his injuries, Thompson was optioned to the Oklahoma City Dodgers to begin the 2017 season, but was called up to the parent club partway through the season. Ultimately, he played in 95 games for the Oklahoma City club and 27 for the Dodgers. In his big-league appearances in 2017, he batted .122 with a .483 OPS and two RBIs.

Thompson was designated for assignment by the Dodgers on March 27, 2018.

Oakland Athletics
On April 3, 2018, Thompson was claimed off waivers by the New York Yankees and then two days later was claimed again, this time by the Oakland Athletics. The Athletics designated him for assignment on April 17, 2018. He had one hit in seven at-bats in three games for the Athletics.

Chicago White Sox (second stint)
Thompson was traded back to the White Sox on April 19, in return for cash considerations. The White Sox designated Thompson for assignment on June 22, 2018. In 48 games in the majors, he hit .116 with three home runs and nine RBI. He elected free agency on November 2, 2018.

Return to Minor Leagues
On December 1, 2018, Thompson signed a minor league deal with the Cleveland Indians, who released him on August 2, 2019. On February 2, 2020, he signed a minor league deal with the Arizona Diamondbacks organization. However he did not play in a game in 2020 due to the cancellation of the minor league season because of the COVID-19 pandemic. He re-signed with the Diamondbacks on a minor league deal on November 2, 2020 but played in only four games for the Triple-A Reno Aces in 2021, going 5-18.

Chicago Cubs
On May 11, 2021, Thompson was traded to the Chicago Cubs in exchange for cash considerations.
Thompson played in 88 games for the Triple-A Iowa Cubs, hitting .233 with 21 home runs and 63 RBI's. On September 14, 2021, the Cubs selected Thompson's contract. On November 3, 2021, Thompson was outrighted off of the 40-man roster and elected free agency two days later. He had seven hits in 28 at bats over 15 games.

San Diego Padres
On March 13, 2022, Thompson signed a minor league contract with the San Diego Padres. His contract was selected from Triple A El Paso on April 28.  On May 10, he was designated for assignment but he declined the assignment and elected free agency.  In six games in the majors, he had one hit in 14 at-bats.

Los Angeles Dodgers (second stint)
On May 19, 2022, Thompson signed a minor league deal with the Detroit Tigers, however they traded him back to the Dodgers on June 20 for cash considerations. He was added to the active roster. Thompson remained on the Dodgers active roster the rest of the season, hitting .268 with 13 home runs and 39 RBI in 74 games.

On January 13, 2023, Thompson agreed to a one-year, $1.45 million contract with the Dodgers, avoiding salary arbitration.

Personal life
Born in Los Angeles, Thompson is the youngest son of former NBA player Mychal Thompson and former University of Portland and University of San Francisco women's volleyball player Julie Thompson. Mychal played for the Los Angeles Lakers and currently works in sports radio. Both of his older brothers are basketball players: Mychel played in the NBA for the Cleveland Cavaliers in 2012, and Klay has played for the Golden State Warriors since 2011. He is a childhood friend of Nolan Arenado.  Thompson represented Great Britain in the 2023 World Baseball Classic; he is eligible as his father Mychal is from the Bahamas. He scored GB's first ever run in their first World Baseball Classic appearance, hitting a home run in the first inning. 

Thompson is Catholic.

References

External links

1991 births
Living people
Sportspeople from Lake Oswego, Oregon
American people of Bahamian descent
Baseball players from California
Major League Baseball outfielders
Chicago White Sox players
Los Angeles Dodgers players
Oakland Athletics players
Chicago Cubs players
San Diego Padres players
Bristol White Sox players
Great Falls Voyagers players
Kannapolis Intimidators players
Winston-Salem Dash players
Birmingham Barons players
Charlotte Knights players
Salt River Rafters players
Tiburones de La Guaira players
American expatriate baseball players in Venezuela
Oklahoma City Dodgers players
Columbus Clippers players
African-American Catholics
Reno Aces players
Iowa Cubs players
El Paso Chihuahuas players
Toledo Mud Hens players
2023 World Baseball Classic players